Le Brasier is a French film directed by Éric Barbier, released in 1991. This was the first full-length feature film directed by Barbier.

Synopsis
Based around the social struggles of a mining area in the 1930s, Le Brasier was the first French film to have a budget of more than 100 million francs, the highest budget in the history of French cinema at that point. The film was a commercial disaster, selling less than 40,000 tickets in the Paris region.

Details 
 Original title: Le Brasier
 Director: Eric Barbier
 Writers: Eric Barbier, Jean-Pierre Barbier
 Length: 122 minutes
 Format : Colour
 Photography : Thierry Arbogast
 Executive producer: Jean-François Lepetit
 Release date: France: 30 January 1991

Starring
 Jean-Marc Barr : Victor
 Maruschka Detmers : Alice
 Thierry Fortineau : Emile
 François Hadji-Lazaro : Gros
 Serge Merlin

Shooting
 The film was shot in three countries: Belgium (notably at Charleroi), Poland (Świętochłowice - Lipiny) and France (at Saint-Étienne mines)

References

External links
 

1991 films
1991 drama films
Films set in the 1930s
Films directed by Éric Barbier
French drama films
1990s French films